Frederick Edmund Emery (27 August 1925 – 10 April 1997) was an Australian psychologist. He was one of the pioneers in the field of organizational development, particularly in the development of the theory around participative work design structures such as self-managing teams. He was widely regarded as one of the finest social scientists of his generation.

Biography
Emery was born in Narrogin, Western Australia, as the son of a drover. He left school as Dux of Fremantle Boys' High in Western Australia at age 14. He gained his honors degree in science from the University of Western Australia in 1946  and joined the teaching staff of the department in 1947. He subsequently spent nine years on the staff of the Department of Psychology, University of Melbourne, where he obtained his Ph.D. in 1953. During 1951–52, he held a UNESCO Fellowship in social sciences and was attached to the Tavistock Institute of Human Relations in the UK.

As a staff member at the University of Melbourne, he made contributions to rural sociology, CPA, and the effects of film and television viewing. 

In 1957, Emery left Australia for London to join the staff of the Tavistock Institute, where he did the majority of his early work. He worked with Eric Trist on the recently discovered concept of sociotechnical systems in 1951–52 as a UNESCO Research Fellow. He subsequently published 'The Characteristics of Sociotechnical Systems in 1959. 

Constantly drawn towards testing social science theory in field settings, he, Eric Trist, one of his closest intellectual collaborators, and other colleagues, established "open socio-technical systems theory" as an alternative paradigm for organisational design – field-tested on a national scale in Norway, in partnership with Einar Thorsrud. 

After his return to Australia, he set about designing a new method to bring in jointly optimised sociotechnical systems, one designed for the diffusion of the concept rather than proof that there was an alternative to autocracy in the workplace. That method is called the Participative Design Workshop and has been used in Australia and many other countries since 1971. It replaces the older 9 step method used in Norway.

Sociotechnical systems are part of a comprehensive theoretical framework called Open Systems Theory (OST). Two of Emery's and Trist's key publications were: "The Causal Texture of Organisational Environments" (1965) and "Towards a Social Ecology" (1972). These publications are the groundwork on which Fred Emery developed OST. 

Emery returned to Australia in 1969 and went to the Australian National University (ANU). He was a senior research fellow there until November 1979, initially in the Department of Sociology, RSSS, and then from 1974 at the Centre for Continuing Education. He had also been visiting professor in Social Systems Science at Wharton's Department of Social Systems Sciences, spending 1967–68 at the Center for Advanced Studies in the Behavioural Sciences at Stanford.

Emery was awarded the first Elton Mayo award in 1988 by the Australian Psychological Society and received a DSc from Macquarie University in 1992. 

At the ANU, Emery continued his action research in industry and the public sector, developing new tools for the diffusion of democracy in organisations and communities. He also attended to a backlog of writing. Within the next 10 years he authored, co-authored, or edited 10 books for publication, and published approximately 30 papers.

In 1979, when his CCE Fellowship expired, unsuccessful efforts were made by some of his colleagues to find a permanent post for him at the ANU. Instead, Emery became one of Australia's outstanding Independent Scholars. By 1985 he published at least another 15 journal articles (a flow which continued to his last year); governments, enterprises, students, universities, and many others continued to seek his expertise. He later continued as a consultant. During this later period, he and Merrelyn Emery refined the Search Conference participative planning process (designed by Fred Emery and Eric Trist in 1958). In the final two years of his life, he co-edited the third and final volume of the "Tavistock anthology", published by the University of Pennsylvania Press: The Social Engagement of Social Science.

Emery died at his home on 10 April 1997, at the age of 71 in Canberra, Australia.

Summary of his work
Emery had a prime interest in the nature of work; in particular, how people organised themselves, the machines, and other resources with which they worked, to achieve their goals, maintain their ideals and values, in the face of what he recognised as "turbulent environments". He made regular contributions to Business Review Weekly, consistently demonstrating his critical intelligence and willingness to challenge. 

He knew that being ahead of one's time can be difficult: "I am inclined to agree with Max Born, the German physicist, who reckoned that the acceptance of a new quantum theory would occur only with the passing away of the old physics professors. The acceptance will await a new generation that starts off with a question mark." 

One story which illustrates this (and may explain some of the reluctance to grant tenure at ANU) was in 1975 when Fred and Merrelyn Emery (then both at the Centre for Continuing Education, Australian National University) published a book which, among other things, discussed the neurological effects of television viewing. In response to a press article about the book in a university publication, six professors and heads of departments (zoology, physiology, pharmacology, psychology, neurobiology, behavioural biology) wrote a letter which strongly criticised the book and its authors. The six professors outlined what they considered to be "the current limits of scientifically acceptable investigation of the nervous system". After criticising the Emerys and their work, they concluded that the article about the Emerys' book "reflects upon the standards of brain research done in this University by those who are in it for the sake of finding out how a nervous system really works rather than for the support or refutation of a particular social issue". However, not only had they not read the Emerys' book, but their specific criticisms did not stand up to scrutiny.

The three books that perhaps best convey his thinking are Toward a Social Ecology from 1972 with Eric Trist, On purposeful systems from 1972 with Russell Ackoff, and Futures We're In from 1977. He also edited for Penguin two volumes of readings called Systems Thinking (the initial volume was reprinted six times), which have been a staple resource on the origins and development of open systems thinking throughout the life sciences.

Publications
Book, a selection:
 1969. Systems thinking. (Ed.). Harmondsworth: Penguin Books.
 1969. Form and content in industrial democracy. With E. Thorsrud, London: Tavistock.
 1972. On Purposeful Systems: An Interdisciplinary Analysis of Individual and Social Behavior as a System of Purposeful Events. With Russell Ackoff. Chicago: Aldine-Atherton.
 1973. Hope within walls. With M. Emery. Canberra: Centre for Continuing Education, Australian National University.
 1976. Choice of futures: To enlighten or inform (Part III). With M. Emery. Leiden: Martinus Nijhoff.
 1976. Living at Work With Chris Phillips. Australian Government Printing Service. 
 1976. Democracy at work. With E. Thorsrud, Leiden: Martinus Nijhoff.
 1977. Futures we are in. Leiden: Martinus Nijhoff.
 1978. Emergence of a new paradigm of work. Canberra: Centre for Continuing Education, Australian National University.
 1980. Domestic market segments for the telephone. With M. Emery, PA Consultants.
 1981. Open systems thinking. Volumes I & II. Penguin.
 1989. Towards real democracy. Toronto: Ontario QWL Centre, Ministry of Labour.
 1991. Attitudes towards Centres for Professional Development at the University of New England. With M. Emery. Lismore: UNE.NR.

Papers and articles, a selection:
 Emery, F. & Trist, E. (1965). The causal texture of organizational environments. Human Relations, 18, 21–32.
 Emery, F. (1972). "Research and higher education". In G. S. Harman and C. Selby-Smith (Eds.), Australian higher education. Melbourne: Angus & Robertson.
 Emery, F. (1975). "Continuing education under a gum-tree". Aust. J. of Adult Education, 17–19.
 Emery, F. (1978). "Youth-vanguard: Victims or the new vandals?" In F. E. Emery (Ed.), Limits to choice. Canberra: Centre for Continuing Education Australian National University.
 Emery, F. (1978). "The fifth wave? Embarking on the next forty years". In F. E. Emery (Ed.), Limits to choice. Canberra: Centre for Continuing Education Australian National University.
 Emery, F. (1980, Autumn). "Communications for a sustainable society". Human Futures, 1–7.
 Emery, F. (April 1992). "The Australian experience". Paper presented to Tusiad Symposium national Participation and Consensus, Istanbul.

References

External links 

 Emery, Frederick Edmund (Fred) (1925–1997) by Alastair Crombie 

1925 births
1997 deaths
Australian scientists
Systems psychologists
Systems scientists
People from Narrogin, Western Australia